Prabhune is a surname native to Indian state of Maharashtra. They belongs to Deshastha Rigvedi Brahmin community.

Notable people
Savita Prabhune
Ramshastri Prabhune
vedant Prabhune
Annaji Datto Prabhune
Pratika Prabhune, an Indian metal vocalist, bassist and songwriter.

References

Hindu surnames